This is the discography of OPM music band Hale.

Albums

Full Albums

Extended plays

Singles

Mainstream singles

1 Single can be found in Hale (Special Edition).

Other released singles

3 Non-album single.

References

Discographies of Filipino artists
Rock music group discographies